Brand New History is the third full-length album by the Canadian industrial alternative rock band Econoline Crush. It was released in 2001 by Restless Records.

For this album, the band enlisted producers Bob Rock (Metallica, Mötley Crüe, Aerosmith) and DJ Swamp (Beck) to help them produce a more accessible blend of their trademark industrial rock and a more pop-oriented sound.

Track listing

 "Make It Right" - 3:30
 "Flamethrower" - 3:57
 "Trash" - 2:49
 "By the Riverside" - 4:01
 "Digging the Heroine" - 3:34
 "Go Off" - 2:55
 "Sinking" - 3:32
 "May I Go" - 3:31
 "My Salvation" - 3:34
 "Here and There" - 3:41
 "Tomorrow Starts Today" - 3:39
 "You Don't Know What It's Like" - 4:06

Personnel
 Trevor Hurst - vocals
 Ziggy - guitar
 Johnny Haro - drums
 Dan Yaremko - bass/additional programming

References

2001 albums
Econoline Crush albums
Albums produced by Bob Rock
Albums recorded at Metalworks Studios
Restless Records albums